Uriah Grant (born January 20, 1961) is a Jamaican former professional boxer who held the IBF Cruiserweight Title.

Professional career
Grant turned pro in 1984 as a light heavyweight and lost to Henry Tillman in his second pro fight. In 1986 he defeated former light heavyweight champion Matthew Saad Muhammad. He looked headed towards a journeyman status, and dropped a series of fights, including a decision to Bobby Czyz in 1990. In 1991 he lost to Frank Tate, and moved up to cruiserweight.  In 1993 he landed a shot at IBF Cruiserweight titleholder Alfred Cole and lost a decision. In 1995 Grant landed a rematch with Cole and lost another decision. The next year Grant was outboxed by a young Chris Byrd over 10 rounds. In 1997 Grant earned a shot at IBF Cruiserweight titleholder Adolpho Washington and won a close decision, winning his only title.  Grant lost the belt in his next fight to Imamu Mayfield.

Thomas Hearns TKO
Grant had a resurgence in 2000 when he defeated Thomas Hearns in the second round. By the end of the first round, Hearns could be seen limping on his right leg. By the beginning of the next round, Hearns was forced to retire, claiming that he was unable to continue due to an injury to an ankle. His cornermen determined that his ankle was either severely sprained, or broken.

In 2002 Grant stepped up to heavyweight and took on Brian Nielsen, losing a decision. Grant dropped back down to cruiserweight, but failed to win another fight, including losses to Rydell Booker in 2003 and Eliecer Castillo in 2004. Grant announced his retirement after the bout with Castillo.

Professional boxing record

See also
List of cruiserweight boxing champions

External links

1961 births
Living people
Jamaican male boxers
Light-heavyweight boxers
Cruiserweight boxers
World cruiserweight boxing champions
International Boxing Federation champions
International Boxing Organization champions
People from Saint Andrew Parish, Jamaica
20th-century Jamaican people
21st-century Jamaican people